Limeh Sara (also Romanized as Līmeh Sarā) is a village in Owshiyan Rural District, Chaboksar District, Rudsar County, Gilan Province, Iran. At the 2006 census, its population was 136, in 39 families.

References 

Populated places in Rudsar County